This is a list of the National Register of Historic Places listings in Idaho County, Idaho.

This is intended to be a complete list of the properties and districts on the National Register of Historic Places in Idaho County, Idaho, United States. Latitude and longitude coordinates are provided for many National Register properties and districts; these locations may be seen together in a map.

There are 43 properties and districts listed on the National Register in the county.

Current listings

|}

Former listings

|}

See also

 List of National Historic Landmarks in Idaho
 National Register of Historic Places listings in Idaho

References

Idaho